Brian Smith (born 7 July 1967 in Paisley) is a Scottish  former racing cyclist turned commentator and manager.

Before turning professional Smith rode for the French amateur team Athletic Club de Boulogne-Billancourt. He won the professional men's race at the British National Road Race Championships in 1991 and 1994, and was runner-up in 1992 and 1993. He competed for Britain in the 1996 Olympic road race and represented Scotland at the Commonwealth Games in 1986, 1990 and 1998. He also won the Grand Prix Midtbank in 1994.

Since 2009, he has commentated on cycle racing for British Eurosport. He also joined the  cycling team as general manager in 2011. Following Endura's merger with the German-based NetApp squad at the end of 2012 to form , Smith was initially appointed to the role of assistant general manager before becoming the team's Business Development Manager. In July 2014 team  appointed Brian Smith as interim general manager until the end of the year as he had participated in the formation of the now-defunct Cervélo TestTeam. In addition Smith acts as manager to Czech rider Leopold König. In April 2016 it was announced that Smith would leave Team Dimension Data (as MTN-Qhubeka had become) at the end of the month by mutual consent, with Smith explaining that his role had become less hands-on and more focused on administration and logistics with the team's achievement of UCI WorldTeam status.

Smith is the founder of the Braveheart Cycling Fund, which was launched in 2003 to support young Scottish racing cyclists.

Major results

1987
 1st Stage 2 Girvan Easter Three Day
1988
 3rd Manx International Road Race
 3rd Paris–Troyes
1990
 1st Lincoln Grand Prix
 3rd Prix des Flandres Françaises
1991
 1st  Road race, National Road Championships
 2nd Tredegar
1992
 1st Brighton
 1st Glasgow Criterium
 2nd Road race, National Road Championships
 3rd Overall Tour of Lancashire
 7th Overall Tour of Britain
1993
 1st Bishops Castle
 1st Manx International Road Race
 1st Manchester
 1st Port Talbot
 2nd Road race, National Road Championships
1994
 1st  Road race, National Road Championships
 1st GP Herning
1995
 1st Tour of the Fountain
1996
 1st Overall Tour of the Kingdom
1st Stage 2
 1st Stage 4 Tucson Bicycle Classic
1997
 3rd Manx Premier Trophy
1998
 1st Stage 2 Tour of Lancashire
 3rd Overall Procam Two Day

References

External links
 

Living people
British male cyclists
Scottish male cyclists
1967 births
Sportspeople from Paisley, Renfrewshire
Cycling announcers
Olympic cyclists of Great Britain
Cyclists at the 1996 Summer Olympics